Everspeed is a French holding company for motorsport related companies. The company was founded by Jacques Nicolet as JN Holding. The company was renamed as Everspeed in 2016.

History

Jacques Nicolet took over Saulnier Racing in January 2007. He later founded JN Holding on 14 December 2007. Saulnier Racing was rebranded as OAK Racing in early 2009. The following year Nicolet and business partner Joël Rivière bought the assets of Pescarolo Sport for €400,000. Until 2013 Pescarolo Sport kept competing in various endurance racing series under their own name. The assets were also use to start Onroak Automotive in 2012.

In 2016 the group bought the struggling engine builder Sodemo. Sodemo was owned by a number of shareholders. The companies founder Guillaume Maillard was a minority shareholder while Luxemburg based private equity firm Finext was the majority shareholder.

Divisions

Motorsport
 Onroak Automotive (ACO selected LMP3 constructor)
 Mygale (50% ownership, FIA selected Formula 4 constructor.
 Sodemo (engine development)
 AOTech (racing simulators and aerodynamic development)
 OAK Racing (racing team)
 Marcassus Sport (official dealer for Lotus Cars, Morgan among others)
 Les Deux Arbres (exploitation of Circuit du Val de Vienne)
Learning
Ecodime (training of technical functions)
Ecodime Italia
Composites
 HP Composites (production of carbon fibre components)
Connection
 DPPI Images (sport images press agency)
 Sportagraph (digital sports content creation)

Purchases
Throughout the companies existence, Everspeed and its associates have included various companies in its divisions. Most notably:

Pescarolo Sport

After a number of disappointing racing seasons the assets of Pescarolo Sport were sold at auction in 2010. Jacques Nicolet and business partner Joël Rivière, with help from Hervé Poulain, acquired the assets for €400,000. Henri Pescarolo was again placed at the head of the rebranded Pescarolo Team. The team continued until 2014 when it was liquidated. In the meantime, the assets were used to form Onroak Automotive.

Ligier

In 2013 Onroak Automotive formed a partnership with Guy Ligier. Onroak would continue to build Ligier branded Le Mans Prototype racecars and Group CN prototypes.

Crawford Composites

American sportscar constructor Crawford Composites was bought by Onroak Automotive in 2016. Onroak took over construction of the Crawford FIA Formula 4 chassis.

Tork Engineering
French racecar constructor Tork Engineering was bought by Onroak Automotive in 2017. Tork Engineering built cars for the Mitjet Series as well as Dacia ice racing cars.

References

 
Companies based in Paris
Holding companies established in 2007
French companies established in 2007
2007 establishments in France
Motorsport in France